The General Union of Lancashire and Yorkshire Warp Dressers' Association was a trade union representing workers involved in preparing warp yarn for weaving who were based in northern England.

History

The origins of the union lay in the Federated Society of Warpdressers, founded in 1891.  Three years later, it was reformed as the "General Union", with local unions in Bradford, Chorley, Halifax, Manchester, Nelson, Preston, Rochdale and Skipton affiliating.  Unusually for a textile union, it covered workers in a variety of materials, including cotton, wool and worsted.  It was also unusual in that it did not provide any support for industrial action, but instead saw its principal purpose as an employment exchange, helping unemployed members find work in other mills.  Within Yorkshire, it also recruited twisters and drawers, but those workers in Lancashire instead joined the Amalgamated Association of Beamers, Twisters and Drawers (Hand and Machine).

Affiliates of the union included:

On formation, the union had only 1,179 members, but this steadily increased until 1914, when it peaked at 3,362.  It affiliated to the Northern Counties Textile Trades Federation.  It lost members when the Chorley and Preston societies disaffiliated, but these later rejoined; however, membership did not recover, and by 1949 was down to only 1,040.  Faced with this decline, the Bradford and Halifax societies merged with two unaffiliated bodies: the Leeds Warpdressers and the Textile Daymen and Cloth Pattern Makers, forming the Yorkshire Society of Textile Craftsmen, the new organisation maintaining its affiliation.

In 1970, the union dissolved, its remaining constituents gradually merging into the Association of Preparatory Workers.

General Secretaries
1891: W. Clayton
1899: James White
1928: Cameron W. Doodson
1962: Walter Rothwell

References

Trade unions established in 1894
Trade unions disestablished in 1970
Defunct trade unions of the United Kingdom
1894 establishments in the United Kingdom
Textile and clothing trade unions
Trade unions based in West Yorkshire